

Club Records

Biggest Wins

Biggest Losses

Most Consecutive Wins
 15, 28 March 2016 - 24 July 2016 
 Longest Winning Streak - 15 (2016)
 Most Home Wins in Succession - 12 (8 April 1989 – 7 April 1990) 
 Most Away Wins in Succession:  6 (1995, 2016) 
 Most Wins in a Season:  18 (1999)

Most Consecutive Loses
 13, June 27, 2009 to March 29, 2010

Biggest Crowds
 Biggest Toyota Park Crowd:  23,302 (vs St George-Illawarra Dragons in 2004) 
 Biggest Crowd:  83,625 (vs Melbourne Storm, NRL Grand Final 2016)

Biggest Comeback
Recovered from a 24-point deficit against the Sydney Roosters at the 31st minute.
Trailed 24–6 at halftime to win 30–28 at Allianz Stadium on 5 July 2014

Worst Collapse
Surrendered a 22-point lead.
 Led Melbourne Storm 22-0 after 32 minutes to lose 36–32 at Toyota Park on 16 March 2003

First Match
vs Eastern Suburbs, Sydney Sports Ground- Sunday, 2 April 1967.  Score:  Cronulla won 11-5

Individual Records

Most First Grade Games
348, Paul Gallen (2001–2019)
328, Andrew Ettingshausen (1983–2000)
235, Wade Graham* (2011–)
232, David Peachey (1994–2005)
222, Mitch Healey (1989–2000)
216, Dane Sorensen (1977–1983, 1985–1989)
212, Danny Lee (1988–1998)
212, Andrew Fifita (2012–2022)
202, Steve Rogers (1973–1982, 1985)
187, David Hatch (1979–1990)

Most Points For Club
1,255 (82 tries, 502 goals, 5 field goals), Steve Rogers (1973–1982, 1985)
1,112 (75 tries, 406 goals), Mat Rogers (1995–2001)
948 (55 tries, 364 goals), Luke Covell (2005–2010)
666 (166 tries, 1 goal), Andrew Ettingshausen (1983–2000)
657 (17 tries, 303 goals), Barry Andrews (1971–1979)
520 (37 tries, 185 goals, 2 field goals), Alan Wilson (1986–1991, 1994)

Most Tries For Club
165, Andrew Ettingshausen (1983–2000)
110, David Peachey (1994–2005)
82, Steve Rogers (1973–1982, 1985)
75, Mat Rogers (1995–2001)
67, Sosaia Feki (2013–2019)
66, Valentine Holmes (2014–2018)
63, Ray Corcoran (1968–1975)
63, Paul Gallen (2001–2019)
57, Jonathan Docking (1984–1991)
56, Colin Best (1998–2002, 2011–2012)

(*) player still active in the Cronulla Sharks team.

Rothmans Medal winners
 Terry Hughes (1968)
 Ken Maddison (1973)
 Steve Rogers (1975)
 Barry Russell (1988)
 Gavin Miller (1989) - co-winner
 Paul Green (1995)

Dally M Medal winners
 Preston Campbell (2001)
 Nicho Hynes* (2022)

See also

List of NRL records

References

External links

Records
Sydney-sport-related lists
National Rugby League lists
Australian records
Rugby league records and statistics